Orašje is a town and municipality in Bosnia and Herzegovina.

Orašje may also refer to:
 HNK Orašje, a football club from Orašje

Places
 Orašje (Dubravica), a hamlet in Dubravica, Serbia
 Orašje (Varvarin), a village in the municipality of Varvarin, Serbia
 Orašje (Vlasotince), a village in the municipality of Vlasotince, Serbia
 Orašje, North Macedonia, a village in the municipality of Jegunovce, North Macedonia
 Orašje Popovo, a village in the municipality of Trebinje, Republika Srpska, Bosnia and Herzegovina
 Orašje Površ, a village in the municipality of Trebinje, Republika Srpska, Bosnia and Herzegovina
 Orašje, Tuzla, a village in the municipality of Tuzla, Federation of Bosnia and Herzegovina, Bosnia and Herzegovina
 Orašje Zubci, a village in the municipality of Trebinje, Republika Srpska, Bosnia and Herzegovina

See also